The 1993–94 National Soccer League season, was the 18th season of the National Soccer League in Australia.

Regular season

League table

Finals series

Individual awards
Player of the Year: Mark Viduka (Melbourne Knights)
U-21 Player of the Year: Mark Viduka (Melbourne Knights)
Top Scorer: Mark Viduka (Melbourne Knights) – 16 goals
Coach of the Year: Mirko Bazic (Melbourne Knights)

References
NSL Awards
Australia - List of final tables (RSSSF)

National Soccer League (Australia) seasons
1994 in Australian soccer
1993 in Australian soccer
Aus
Aus